Grevillea thyrsoides is a small, spreading shrub which is endemic to an area in the Mid West and Wheatbelt region of Western Australia.

Description
It produces red flowers in late summer to early autumn and mid-winter to early spring (February to March and July to September in Australia.)

Taxonomy
The species was formerly described in 1855 by Swiss botanist Carl Meissner in the William Jackson Hooker work Hooker's Journal of Botany and Kew Garden Miscellany based on plant material collected by James Drummond.
There are two sub species:
Grevillea thyrsoides subsp. pustulata Olde & Marriott
Grevillea thyrsoides Meisn. subsp. thyrsoides

Distribution
The shrub is found to around Eneabba in the north west to Coorow in the northeast and down to Watheroo in the south east to around Dandaragan in the south west where it is often found growing in sandy to sany gravelly soils often containing laterite.

See also
List of Grevillea species

References

thyrsoides
Endemic flora of Western Australia
Eudicots of Western Australia
Proteales of Australia
Taxa named by Carl Meissner
Plants described in 1855